Andrei Borisovich Kuznetsov (born 9 January 1988) is a Russian professional footballer.

Club career
He made his professional debut in the Russian Football National League in 2008 for FC Zvezda Irkutsk. He played one game in the UEFA Cup 2007–08 for FC Lokomotiv Moscow on 5 December 2007 against Panathinaikos FC.

References

1988 births
Sportspeople from Ulyanovsk
Living people
Russian footballers
Russia youth international footballers
Association football defenders
FC Zvezda Irkutsk players
FC Lokomotiv Moscow players
FC Sibir Novosibirsk players
FC Khimki players
PFC Spartak Nalchik players
FC Rotor Volgograd players
FC Tyumen players
FC Avangard Kursk players
FC Volga Ulyanovsk players